Football Club Altyn Asyr, also known as Altyn Asyr Ashgabat or simply Altyn Asyr, which translates to "Golden Century", is a Turkmen football club based in Ashgabat. Founded in 2008, the club competes in the Ýokary Liga, the top tier of Turkmen football. It has remained there ever since, winning the Turkmenistan Higher League championship eight times in a row (2014, 2015, 2016, 2017, 2018, 2019, 2020 and 2021). The club also won the Turkmenistan Cup for 5 times in 2009, 2015, 2016, 2019 and 2020 and has been regular in AFC Cup recently. The team plays in the Ashgabat Stadium.

History

From the first days of participation in official competitions team was headed by Umarguly Nurmamedov. From 2008 until mid-2012, team was led by Ali Gurbani, and from mid-2012 coach was Bayram Durdyýew. Since mid-2013 the head of the club became Gurbanmurat Hojageldiev. Since the beginning of 2014, the team was led by Ýazguly Hojageldyýew, helped him famous Turkmen footballers Goçguly Goçgulyýew and Gurbangeldi Durdyýew. At the end of the 2014 Ýokary Liga, for the first time they became the champions of Turkmenistan.

In the 2015 season, Altyn Asyr debuted in AFC Cup with loss to Al-Saqr (0:1) in Ashgabat Stadium. Team won the Turkmenistan Super Cup 2015, and defended the championship in 6 rounds before the end of 2015 Ýokary Liga. In December, the team won Şagadam FK and won the 2015 Turkmenistan Cup.

In 2018, Altyn Asyr reached the AFC Cup Final, where lost in the decisive match to Air Force Club from Iraq. Altyn Asyr were the first team from Turkmenistan to reach the AFC Cup final. If they were to win the final, they would become the second team from Central Asia to win the AFC Cup, after Nasaf from Uzbekistan in 2011.

In June 2019, Altyn Asyr, tied the final round of the group stage with FC Istiklol - 1:1, and for the second year in a row went to the Inter-zone play-off semi-finals of the 2019 AFC Cup as the winner of the Central Asian group D. In August 2019, Kenyan Peter Opiyo and Niger Uche Kalu signed a contract with FC Altyn Asyr. This is the first foreign footballer in the history of the club and the first legionnaire in the 2019 Ýokary Liga. However, they lost to Hanoi FC 4:5 on aggregate.

Domestic

Continental

Squad

Club officials

Management
 Gurbanmyrat Hojageldyýew: Club director
 Annamuhammet Yarow: Manager

Technical staff
 Ýazguly Hojageldyýew: Head Coach
 Ýakup Ekezow and Begench Garaýew: Assistant coach
 Gurbangeldi Durdyýew and Hojaahmet Arazow: Fitness coach
 Dovlet Gylýjov: Doctor

Managerial history

Stadium 
Until 2021, Altyn Asyr had never had its own stadium, with the team historically playing in various Ashgabat. The main home ground for AFC Cup games was Kopetdag Stadium, which has a capacity of 26,000. The stadium is situated in Ashgabat.

The team played Ýokary Liga home games at various Ashgabat stadiums: Kopetdag Stadium, Nusaý Stadium and Ashgabat Stadium.

Starting in autumn 2021, Altyn Asyr began to receive teams at the Büzmeýin Sport Topulmy (10,000 capacity).

Kit suppliers and shirt sponsors 
The team is owned by the Türkmenaragatnaşyk Agency of the Ministry of Industry and Communication of Turkmenistan.

Honours
 Ýokary Liga (8) (record) 2014, 2015, 2016, 2017, 2018, 2019, 2020, 2021 .
 Turkmenistan Cup (5) 2009, 2015, 2016, 2019, 2020. 
 Turkmenistan Super Cup (8) (record)  2015, 2016, 2017, 2018, 2019, 2020, 2021, 2022
 Turkmenistan President's Cup (2) 2010, 2011.

Continental 
 AFC Cup
Runners-up (1): 2018

References

2008 establishments in Turkmenistan
Association football clubs established in 2008
Football clubs in Ashgabat
Football clubs in Turkmenistan